George Wombwell was a proprietor of Wombwell's Travelling Menagerie.

George Wombwell may also refer to:
Sir George Wombwell, 1st Baronet (1734–1780), British MP for Huntingdon 1774–1780
Sir George Wombwell, 2nd Baronet (1769–1846), English cricketer
Sir George Wombwell, 3rd Baronet (1792–1855) of the Wombwell baronets
George Philip Frederick Wombwell, presumed 7th Baronet (born 1949) of the Wombwell baronets
Sir George Orby Wombwell (1832–1913), British baronet

See also
Wombwell baronets, of Wombwell in the County of York, a title in the Baronetage of Great Britain